Avon Isle Park Pavilion is a  by  sandstone dance pavilion located on Detroit Road, Avon, Ohio. The dance pavilion is housed in a building featuring several French Colonial revival architecture pieces, including a low hip roof and columned porches. From the 1920s until the 1970s, the venue hosted a variety of civic and social events. It was also available for private events. During the early years, the larger cities nearby; Lorain and Elyria prohibited dancing on Sunday. This allowed Avon Isle to host big-name entertainers like Guy Lombardo. Currently, the building has been renovated and is available for rent by businesses as well as individuals who wish to use the building as a venue for their events at a fee for Avon residents of $150 for the first two hours and an additional $35 for each additional hour and a fee of $200 with a fee of $50 for each additional hour for non-Avon residents.

Avon Isle was listed on the National Register of Historic Places in 2010.

References

External links
National Register nomination form

Houses on the National Register of Historic Places in Ohio
Houses in Lorain County, Ohio
National Register of Historic Places in Lorain County, Ohio
Houses completed in 1920